Fogaras was an administrative county (comitatus) of the Kingdom of Hungary. Its territory is now in central Romania (south-eastern Transylvania). The county's capital was Fogaras (present-day Făgăraș).

Geography

Fogaras county shared borders with Romania and the Hungarian counties Szeben, Nagy-Küküllő and Brassó. The river Olt formed most of its northern border. The ridge of the southern Carpathian Mountains forms its southern border. Its area was  around 1910.

History
The Fogaras region was an administrative territorial entity of the Kingdom of Hungary since the 15th century. Fogaras county was formed in 1876, when the administrative structure of Transylvania was changed. In 1920, by the Treaty of Trianon the county became part of Romania;  Făgăraș County was created, with an identical territory. The territory lies in the present Romanian counties Brașov and Sibiu (the westernmost part).

Demographics

Subdivisions

In the early 20th century, the subdivisions of Fogaras county were:

Notes

References 

Kingdom of Hungary counties in Transylvania